Selatosomus aeneus is a species of click beetle found in Europe. It was originally described as Corymbites aeneus by Carl Linnaeus.

Elateridae
Beetles described in 1758
Taxa named by Carl Linnaeus